The Dirty Dozen is the fourteenth studio album from blues rock artist George Thorogood and the Destroyers.  The album was released on July 28, 2009. The Dirty Dozen reached #1 on the Billboard Top Blues Albums and was on the chart for 11 weeks.

The album includes six new songs (1-6) and six classic favorites (7-12), including three tracks that were previously out-of-print in the U.S.

Track listing 
 "Tail Dragger" (Willie Dixon) – 3:41
 "Drop Down Mama" (John Adam Estes) – 4:20
 "Run Myself Out of Town" (Wendell Holmes) – 3:03
 "Born Lover" (Muddy Waters) – 4:12
 "Twenty Dollar Gig" (Mickey Bones) – 3:16
 "Let Me Pass" (Ellas McDaniel) – 3:40
 "Howlin' for My Baby" (Dixon, Howlin' Wolf) – 5:13 
 "Highway 49" (Big Joe Williams) – 5:46 
 "Six Days on The Road" (Earl Green, Carl Montgomery) – 4:27 
 "Treat Her Right (Roy Head, Gene Kurtz) – 3:32
 "Hello Little Girl" (Chuck Berry) – 3:46
 "Blue Highway" (Nick Gravenites, David Getz) – 4:44

track 7        - from Haircut, 1993
tracks 8 & 10   - from Born To Be Bad, 1988
tracks 9 & 11   - from Boogie People, 1991
track 12       - from Bad To The Bone, 1982

Personnel

Musicians
George Thorogood – guitar, vocals
Jim Suhler – guitar (tracks 1-6)
Bill Blough – bass
Jeff Simon – drums
Buddy Leach – saxophone (tracks 1-6)
Hank Carter – saxophone (tracks 7-12)
Steve Chrismar – guitar (tracks 8-11)
Ian Stewart – piano (track 12)
Jake Vest – backing vocals (track 3)

Technical
Tracks 1-6 only, see album articles for other technical personnel.

Mike Donahue – executive producer
Delaware Destroyers – producer
Jim Gaines – producer
Shawn Berman – engineer

References 

George Thorogood and the Destroyers albums
2009 albums